

References

 
Cuban culture
Cuba
Society of Cuba
Holidays